Contz-les-Bains (Lorraine Franconian: Nidderkonz) is a commune in the Moselle department in Grand Est in north-eastern France.

The commune is located in the Pays de Sierck at the confluence of the Sauer (known in French as the Sûre) and the Moselle, which form the borders with Luxembourg and Germany. Just over the border in Germany is the town of Perl in Saarland, and the neighboring town in Luxembourg is Schengen.

See also
 Communes of the Moselle department
 Haute-Kontz
 Sierck-les-Bains

References

External links
 

Contzlesbains